David O. Pam (February 1920 - 17 August 2014) was a British librarian and local historian known for his works on the history of Edmonton and Enfield and other areas of the former Edmonton Hundred.

Early life
David Pam was born in Edmonton in February 1920. He spent his early life in a council house there.

Family
Pam married Maisie in 1949. They had two daughters.

Career
Pam was first a reference librarian for the former Borough of Edmonton and in 1976 the local history and museums officer for the London Borough of Enfield. He retired in May 1982 and afterwards devoted himself to writing the history of Edmonton and Enfield and other areas of the former Edmonton Hundred. He was president of the Edmonton Hundred Historical Society and appointed a fellow of the Royal Historical Society in 2006.

Death
Pam died on 17 August 2014.

Selected publications
The New Enfield: Stories of Enfield, Edmonton, and Southgate. London Borough of Enfield, 1977.
The Hungry Years. Survival in Edmonton and Enfield before 1400. Edmonton Hundred Historical Society, 1980 
The Story of Enfield Chase. Enfield Preservation Society, Enfield, 1984. 
A History of Enfield Volume One - Before 1837: A Parish Near London. Enfield Preservation Society, Enfield, 1990.  
A History of Enfield Volume Two - 1837 to 1914: A Victorian Suburb. Enfield Preservation Society, Enfield, 1992. 
A History of Enfield Volume Three - 1914 to 1939: A Desirable Neighbourhood. Enfield Preservation Society, Enfield, 1994. 
The Royal Small Arms Factory Enfield & Its Workers. 1998. 
A Woodland Hamlet - Winchmore Hill. Edmonton Hundred Historical Society, 2004 
Edmonton Ancient Village to Working Class Suburb. Edmonton Hundred Historical Society, 2006 
Enfield Town - Village Green to Shopping Precinct. Edmonton Hundred Historical Society, 2008

References 

1920 births
2014 deaths
Historians of Middlesex
English historians
Fellows of the Royal Historical Society
People from Edmonton, London
English librarians
History of the London Borough of Enfield